In differential geometry, Loewner's torus inequality is an inequality due to Charles Loewner.  It relates the systole and the area of an arbitrary Riemannian metric on the 2-torus.

Statement

In 1949 Charles Loewner proved that every metric on the 2-torus  satisfies the optimal inequality

where "sys" is its systole, i.e. least length of a noncontractible loop.  The constant appearing on the right hand side is the Hermite constant  in dimension 2, so that Loewner's torus inequality can be rewritten as

Case of equality

Alternative formulation

Proof of Loewner's torus inequality

Loewner's torus inequality can be proved most easily by using the computational formula for the variance, 

Namely, the formula is applied to the probability measure defined by the measure of the unit area flat torus in the conformal class of the given torus.  For the random variable X, one takes the conformal factor of the given metric with respect to the flat one.  Then the expected value E(X 2) of X 2 expresses the total area of the given metric.  Meanwhile, the expected value E(X) of X can be related to the systole by using Fubini's theorem.  The variance of X can then be thought of as the isosystolic defect, analogous to the isoperimetric defect of Bonnesen's inequality.  This approach therefore produces the following version of Loewner's torus inequality with isosystolic defect:

where ƒ is the conformal factor of the metric with respect to a unit area flat metric in its conformal class.

Higher genus

Whether or not the inequality 

is satisfied by all surfaces of nonpositive Euler characteristic is unknown.  For orientable surfaces of genus 2 and genus 20 and above, the answer is affirmative, see work by Katz and Sabourau below.

See also
Pu's inequality for the real projective plane
Gromov's systolic inequality for essential manifolds
Gromov's inequality for complex projective space
Eisenstein integer (an example of a hexagonal lattice)
Systoles of surfaces

References

 

Riemannian geometry
Differential geometry
Geometric inequalities
Differential geometry of surfaces
Systolic geometry